Wewak Rural LLG is a local-level government (LLG) of East Sepik Province, Papua New Guinea.

Wards
01. Kambagora
02. Passam 2
03. Passam 1
04. Paliama
05. Passam 3
06. Marik
07. Kreer
10. Magon
12. Simbrangu
13. Suambakau
14. Hambraure
15. Mangrara
17. Yarapi
19. Numoikim
20. Urindogum
21. Mengar 
27. Tangara 
26. Pangaripma
83. Wewak Town

References

Local-level governments of East Sepik Province